Tommy Farrell (born Thomas Farrell Richards; October 7, 1921 – May 9, 2004) was an American actor and comedian who appeared in over 100 films and TV series between 1944 and 1983. He was best known for his sidekick roles in the Hollywood Golden Age.

Career
Farrell made his Broadway debut as a young drummer in Strip for Action and made his movie debut in Winged Victory, the film version of the Army Air Forces play of the same title. He was a corporal at the time.

During the 1940s, he became entrenched as a supporting player in B Westerns and cliffhanger serials. He also appeared  in a number of other films, including Kissin' Cousins costarring with his mother, Glenda Farrell, and Elvis Presley, and A Guide for the Married Man with Walter Matthau. After the Westerns and serials, he migrated to television work.

On television, Farrell played Corporal Thad Carson on The Adventures of Rin Tin Tin, Riff Ryan on The Many Loves of Dobie Gillis, and Chet Holliday, father of Alice Holliday, in the 1958–59 syndicated sitcom This is Alice. He was also a recurring guest star in two other sitcoms, Room for One More and Here's Lucy. He made six appearances on Perry Mason in minor roles such as salesman or reporter. He finally retired in 1979 after filming an episode of the Robert Urich series, Vega$.

Personal life
Farrell was married three times. He had a daughter, born in 1945, with his first wife, Norma, another daughter, born in 1951, with his second wife, Ann, and two more children, a son and a daughter, with his third wife, Bobbi.

Recognition
In 2003, Farrell was honored during the 21st Annual Golden Boot Awards ceremony for his work in the Western genre, along with Sue Ane Langdon, Michael Dante, Graham Greene, Kris Kristofferson, and Tommy Lee Jones, among others.

Death
Farrell died of natural causes at the Motion Picture and Television Fund hospital in Woodland Hills, Los Angeles, California, at the age of 82. At the time of his death, he was the last living B Western sidekick from the golden era of Westerns.

He was survived by his wife, a son, three daughters, and three grandchildren.

Filmography

Films

 Winged Victory (1944) – Soldier in Audience at Camp Show (uncredited)
 Duchess of Idaho (1950) – Chuck
 Atom Man vs. Superman (1950, Serial) – Man Observing Ship Rescue / Briggs, Chs. 2, 10 (uncredited)
 Gunfire (1950) – Lerner—Silver Wagon Driver
 Last of the Buccaneers (1950) – René – Pirate (uncredited)
 Pirates of the High Seas (1950, Serial) – Kelly Walsh
 Pygmy Island (1950) – Captain (uncredited)
 Outlaws of Texas (1950) – Jeff Johnson
 At War with the Army (1950) – Cpl. Clark
 Colorado Ambush (1951) – Terry Williams
 Abilene Trail (1951) – Ed Dawson
 A Yank in Korea (1951) – Jinx Hamilton
 Roar of the Iron Horse (1951, Seial) – Del – Young Outlaw in Polka-Dot Shirt [Chs. 6, 7, 9–11, 15] (uncredited)
 Strangers on a Train (1951) – 1# Miriam's Boyfriend (uncredited)
 The Strip (1951) – Boynton
 The Stooge (1951) – Tommy – Kit Kat Club MC (uncredited)
 Starlift (1951) – Turner – Card Player (uncredited)
 Captain Video: Master of the Stratosphere (1951, Serial) – Atoma Head Soldier [Ch. 2] (uncredited)
 The Marrying Kind (1952) – Cliff (uncredited)
 Night Raiders (1952) – Jim Dugan
 Meet Danny Wilson (1952) - Tommy Wells
 This Woman Is Dangerous (1952) – Bellhop (uncredited)
 Flesh and Fury (1952) – Rocky (uncredited)
 Singin' in the Rain (1952) – Sid Phillips (uncredited)
 The Atomic City (1952) – Baseball Game Usher (uncredited)
 Brave Warrior (1952) – Townsman (uncredited)
 You for Me (1952) – Dr. Rollie Cobb
 The Golden Hawk (1952) – Spanish Captain (uncredited)
 Son of Geronimo: Apache Avenger (1952, Serial) – Frank Baker
 Wyoming Roundup (1952) – Bob Burke
 Girls in the Night (1953) – Frankie
 The 49th Man (1953) – Agent Reynolds
 Siren of Bagdad (1953) – Palace Guard (uncredited)
 Sky Commando (1953) – Pilot (uncredited)
 The Great Adventures of Captain Kidd (1953) – Kidd crewman (uncredited)
 Gunfighters of the Northwest (1954, Serial) – Constable Arch Perry – Ch's 1–2
 Woman Obsessed (1959) – Carnival Barker (uncredited)
 North by Northwest (1959) – Eddie, Elevator Operator (uncredited)
 Wake Me When It's Over (1960) – Smitty (uncredited)
 Bells Are Ringing (1960) – Party Guest (uncredited)
 Swingin' Along (1961) – Georgie
 Breakfast at Tiffany's (1961) – Party Guest (uncredited)
 Saintly Sinners (1962) – Mike (uncredited)
 My Six Loves (1963) – Studio Representative (uncredited)
 Kissin' Cousins (1964) – Master Sgt. William George Bailey
 The Disorderly Orderly (1964) – Policeman (uncredited)
 Never Too Late (1965) – Fred Ainsley (uncredited)
 Boy, Did I Get a Wrong Number! (1966) – Reporter (uncredited)
 A Guide for the Married Man (1967) – Rance G.'s Hanger On

TV shows

 The Adventures of Rin Tin Tin (1955–59) –  Cpl. Thad Carson
 Matinee Theatre (1957) – George Hill
 Maverick (1957) – Lefty Dolan
 Bachelor Father (1957–1961) – Toaster Salesman / Joe Browning / Cecil
 Cheyenne (1958)
 This is Alice (1958) – Chet Holliday
 Dragnet (1958)
 Gunsmoke (1958) – Pfc. Atwood
 Wanted: Dead or Alive (1959) – Billy Bland
 Bourbon Street Beat (1959–1960) – Jay O'Hanlon
 The Many Loves of Dobie Gillis (1959–1961) – Riff Ryan
 Richard Diamond, Private Detective (1960) – Frank Connolly
 Hawaiian Eye (1960–1962) – Freddie / Breezy Gallagher / Cy Bliss
 Pete and Gladys (1961) – Steve
 Bringing Up Buddy (1961) – Billy
 The Roaring 20's (1961) – Hermie Marcus / Al
 Perry Mason (1962–1965) – Reporter / TV Reporter / Jefferson / Herbert Baker / Robert Fordney / Salesman
 Rawhide (1963) – Mister Buzby
 Dr. Kildare (1963) – Wally
 The Fugitive (1964) – Ryan
 The Munsters (1964) – The Assistant
 The Addams Family (1965) – Sam Diamond
 The Lucy Show (1965–1966) – Harry / Pete Murdock
 The Man from U.N.C.L.E. (1966) – Coplin
 F Troop (1966) – Jenks
 The Beverly Hillbillies (1966) – Pilot
 Gomer Pyle, U.S.M.C. (1966–1968) – Assistant Cameraman / Reporter
 Lost in Space (1967) – Cyborg
 Here's Lucy (1968–1974) – Phil Harris' Manager / Bank Teller / Paul / Reporter / Sky Marshal / Morgan
 Get Smart (1970) – Tuttle
 Vega$ (1979) – Harmon Cox
 Hart to Hart (1983) – Roaring Tommy (final appearance)

See also

2003, The 21st Annual Golden Boot Awards

References

External links

Life in Legacy
The New York Times

1921 births
2004 deaths
American male film actors
American male stage actors
American male television actors
Male actors from Los Angeles
Military personnel from California
University of Arizona alumni
United States Army Air Forces non-commissioned officers
United States Army Air Forces personnel of World War II
20th-century American male actors